Ghost is a young adult novel by Jason Reynolds, published August 30, 2016 by Atheneum Books. It is the first book of Reynold's Track series, followed by Patina (2017), Sunny (2018), and Lu (2018).

Ghost was a New York Times best seller and National Book Award for Young People's Literature finalist.

Reception 
Ghost was a New York Times best seller

The book received starred reviews from Booklist, Publishers Weekly, and Kirkus, as well as positive reviews from The Bulletin of the Center for Children’s Books and Horn Book Magazine.

Reviewing Ghost in The New York Times, Kate Messner said that in his title character, Reynolds has created a protagonist "whose journey is so genuine that he's worthy of a place alongside Ramona and Joey Pigza on the bookshelves where our most beloved, imperfect characters live."

The audiobook, narrated by Guy Lockard, received a starred review from School Library Journal.

Kirkus, New York Public Library, Publishers Weekly, School Library Journal, the New Atlantic Independent Booksellers Association, and the Center for the Study of Multicultural Children's Literature named it one of the best books of 2016.

References 

2016 children's books
Atheneum Books books
Books by Jason Reynolds